The Walter Hurt Cargill House, in Columbus, Georgia, is a Georgian Revival-style house built in about 1918.  It was listed on the National Register of Historic Places in 1980.

It is brick, and is a raised one-story cottage.  It has a center portico supported by two columns at each end.

It was home of Walter H. and Mamie Cargill.  Walter was associated with Hardaway-Cargill Co., a local syrup manufacturing firm.

It is also a contributing building in the High Uptown Historic District.

References

Georgian Revival architecture in Georgia (U.S. state)
Houses completed in 1918